Žitorađa is a town and municipality located in the Toplica District of the southern Serbia. The municipality includes 30 settlements. According to the 2011 census, the population of the municipality is 16,368 inhabitants.

Geography
Žitorađa is 35 km to the south-west from Niš. It lies 10 km from Corridor 10, which connects Serbia with North Macedonia, Greece and further east.

Settlements

Aside from the town of Žitorađa, the municipality includes the following settlements:

 Badnjevac
 Đakus
 Debeli Lug
 Donje Crnatovo
 Donji Drenovac
 Držanovac
 Dubovo
 Glašince
 Gornje Crnatovo
 Gornji Drenovac
 Grudaš
 Jasenica
 Kare
 Konjarnik
 Lukomir
 Novo Momčilovo
 Pejkovac
 Podina
 Rečica
 Samarinovac
 Smrdić
 Stara Božurna
 Staro Momčilovo
 Studenac
 Toponica
 Vlahovo
 Voljčince
 Zladovac

History
The village has its origins in the Eastern Roman (Byzantine) town "Ad Herculum" (Ad Hercules), which existed in the 4th century. The archaeological site of the Byzantine town is known as Žitoradsko kale, located on the Pasjača mountain, while a "Latin church" dating to the period is located in Glašince.

The primary school was founded in 1873. In 1877, the region was liberated from the Ottoman Empire. This event is considered the founding year of Žitorađa municipality.

In the Expulsion of the Albanians during 1877 and 1878, many Albanians were forced to leave Žitorađa and its surroundings and became muhaxhirs.

Demographics

The municipality had 16,368 people, according to the 2011 census.

Ethnic groups
The ethnic composition of the municipality:

Economy
The economy of Žitorada is mostly based on agriculture. There are 23,300 hectares of arable land. The farm “December 
1st” has the capacity of 30,000,000 fattened pigs per year, and it is one of the most successful in the whole of Serbia.

The following table gives a preview of total number of registered people employed in legal entities per their core activity (as of 2018):

Gallery

Trivia
The village was the site of the pre-ceremonial wedding of Serbian folk singer Svetlana Ražnatović "Ceca", who was born in the village, and Željko Ražnatović "Arkan", a notorious career criminal and paramilitary leader, on 19 February 1995. The whole wedding was broadcast nationwide on RTV Pink.

Notable people
 Ivica Dačić (b. 1966), Serbian politician (Socialist Party of Serbia), current Minister of Internal Affairs
 Svetlana "Ceca" Ražnatović (b. 1973), Serbian folk singer popular throughout former Yugoslavia and Bulgaria.
 Miodrag "Miki" Rakić (1975-2014), Serbian politician, who played key role in reconciliation of SPS and DS, forming of NDS and SNS, former vice president of DS and chief of staff of president Boris Tadic

References

External links

 

Populated places in Toplica District
Municipalities and cities of Southern and Eastern Serbia
Roman towns and cities in Serbia